Bizz (born Bryce Bernius) is an American rock guitarist, best known for his work with industrial/shock rock band Genitorturers, horror punk band The Undead (also featuring ex members of The Misfits; Bobby Steele and Joey Image), and Sydney metal band Our Last Enemy. He is also a founding member of Florida based punk band MadCap.

References 
 Bizz
 The Genitorturers: Blackheart Revolution | Reviews @ Ultimate-Guitar.com

External links 
 Bizz, MySpace page 
 Genitoruturers Official website 
 Genitorturers, MySpace page

American punk rock musicians
American rock guitarists
American male guitarists
Living people
Year of birth missing (living people)
Place of birth missing (living people)
Genitorturers members
The Undead members